= Klinovka =

Klinovka may refer to:

- Klinovka, Republic of Mordovia, a village (selo) in the Republic of Mordovia, Russia
- Klinovka, name of several other rural localities in Russia
- Zheleznodorozhnogo razyezda Klinovka, a settlement in the Republic of Tatarstan, Russia
